The Flash is an upcoming American superhero film based on the DC Comics character of the same name. Produced by DC Studios, Double Dream, and the Disco Factory, and set for distribution by Warner Bros. Pictures, it is intended to be the 13th installment in the DC Extended Universe (DCEU). The film is directed by Andy Muschietti from a screenplay by Christina Hodson and stars Ezra Miller as Barry Allen / The Flash alongside Sasha Calle, Michael Shannon, Ron Livingston, Maribel Verdú, Kiersey Clemons, Antje Traue, and Michael Keaton. In the film, Barry travels back in time to prevent his mother's murder, which brings unintended consequences.

Development of a film featuring the Flash began in the late 1980s, with multiple writers and directors attached to the project through 2014. The film was then redeveloped as a part of the DCEU, with Miller cast as the title character. Multiple directors were attached to the film over the following years, with Seth Grahame-Smith, Rick Famuyiwa, and the duo of John Francis Daley and Jonathan Goldstein each departing the project due to creative differences. Muschietti and Hodson joined the film in July 2019, and pre-production began in January 2020. The film is influenced by the comic book storyline Flashpoint, featuring multiple DC Comics characters, including both Ben Affleck and Keaton, reprising their respective versions of Batman. Principal photography took place from April to October 2021 at Warner Bros. Studios, Leavesden, and on location around the United Kingdom.

The Flash is scheduled to have its world premiere at CinemaCon on April 25, 2023, before its release in the United States on June 16, following multiple delays caused by the director changes, the COVID-19 pandemic, and post-production setbacks.

Premise 
Barry Allen / The Flash travels back in time to prevent his mother's murder, which traps him in an alternate reality without metahumans.  He enlists the help of an older Batman and the Kryptonian castaway Supergirl from alternate realities in order to save this world from the restored General Zod and return to his universe.

Cast 

 Ezra Miller as Barry Allen / The Flash:A police forensic investigator from Central City and member of the Justice League who can move at superhuman speeds using the Speed Force. Miller described Barry as multi-dimensional, with human flaws. Miller also portrays an alternate version of Barry from a different timeline, while Ian Loh portrays a young Barry.
 Sasha Calle as Kara Zor-El / Supergirl: A powerful Kryptonian with powers, abilities, and a costume similar to Superman. Calle is the first Latina actress to portray Supergirl.
 Michael Shannon as General Zod: A Kryptonian general who possesses the same powers as Superman and was killed by him in Man of Steel (2013).
 Ron Livingston as Henry Allen: Barry's father who was wrongfully convicted of his wife's murder. Billy Crudup previously played the character in Justice League (2017) and its director's cut Zack Snyder's Justice League (2021). Crudup could not return to the role due to scheduling conflicts with filming for the television series The Morning Show.
 Maribel Verdú as Nora Allen: Barry's mother who was murdered in his youth. 
 Kiersey Clemons as Iris West: A journalist for the Picture News and love interest for Barry.
 Antje Traue as Faora-Ul: General Zod's second-in-command, who was sent to the Phantom Zone at the end of Man of Steel.
 Michael Keaton as Bruce Wayne / Batman:A wealthy socialite from Gotham City who moonlights as a crimefighting vigilante. This version of Wayne hails from an alternate universe. Keaton reprises his role from Batman (1989) and Batman Returns (1992), with this film ignoring the events of the subsequent films Batman Forever (1995) and Batman & Robin (1997), in which Keaton did not appear.

Ben Affleck reprises his DCEU role as Bruce Wayne / Batman, the original version of Wayne from Barry's timeline and the leader of the Justice League. Director Andy Muschietti said the character has a substantial emotional impact on the film through his relationship with Barry, in part because their mothers were both murdered. Affleck said his scenes in the film were his favorite as the character and a "nice finish" for his time as Batman up to that point. Temuera Morrison, who portrays Aquaman's father Thomas Curry in Aquaman (2018) and Aquaman and the Lost Kingdom (2023), is also expected to be in the film. Additionally, Saoirse-Monica Jackson, Rudy Mancuso, and Luke Brandon Field have been cast in undisclosed roles.

Production

Development

Early attempts 
Development of a film based on the DC Comics character the Flash began in the late 1980s when Warner Bros. Pictures hired comic book writer Jeph Loeb to write a screenplay. Warner Bros. hired David S. Goyer to write, direct, and produce a new version of The Flash in December 2004 after he impressed them with his script for Batman Begins (2005). Goyer approached Ryan Reynolds to portray Wally West / The Flash after working with him on the Marvel Comics-based film Blade: Trinity (2004), and intended to have the character Barry Allen appear in a supporting role. Goyer was influenced for the film's tone by Sam Raimi's Spider-Man trilogy and the Flash comic book runs by Mike Baron, Mark Waid, and Geoff Johns. By early February 2007, Goyer left the project due to creative differences with the studio, and Shawn Levy was hired to direct and oversee the writing of a new draft written by Chris Brancato, which used elements from Goyer's script. Later that month, Warner Bros. announced the development of a Justice League film with Michelle and Kieran Mulroney writing the screenplay. George Miller signed on to direct the film, entitled Justice League: Mortal, in September, with Adam Brody cast as the Flash. It was envisioned as the start of a franchise with planned sequels and spin-offs, including the Flash film.

Levy left The Flash in October 2007 due to scheduling conflicts with Night at the Museum: Battle of the Smithsonian (2009). David Dobkin took over as director and began developing the film as a spin-off from Justice League: Mortal with a focus on Wally West. Craig Wright was writing a script for the film the next month, before Justice League: Mortal was canceled and Warner Bros. set a 2008 release for The Flash. Further development was delayed due to the 2007–2008 Writers Guild of America strike. Charles Roven joined the project as a producer by July 2009, with Geoff Johns consulting and writing a film treatment that Dan Mazeau adapted into a screenplay. In October, Roven said the studio was not confident enough in their take to greenlight the film, though Mazeau disputed this and said the film was moving forward as planned. In June 2010, Green Lantern (2011) writers Greg Berlanti, Michael Green, and Marc Guggenheim were hired to write a new treatment for The Flash based on a recent comics run by Johns that featured Barry Allen.

DC Extended Universe 

Warner Bros. was planning a new shared universe of films based on DC Comics by July 2013, and had tentative plans to release a Flash film in 2016. In October 2014, Warner Bros. and DC Films announced a slate of planned projects as part of the new DC Extended Universe (DCEU). The Flash was set for release on March 23, 2018, with Ezra Miller set to star in the film as Barry Allen / The Flash; Miller first made cameo appearances in Batman v Superman: Dawn of Justice (2016) and Suicide Squad (2016), starred in the team-up film Justice League (2017), and briefly appeared in the Arrowverse crossover event "Crisis on Infinite Earths" (2019–20) which acknowledged a wider DC Multiverse. Warner Bros. offered James Wan the choice of directing a movie about either Aquaman or the Flash, and he ultimately chose to make Aquaman (2018). By April 2015, Phil Lord and Christopher Miller were writing a story treatment for the Flash film with the possibility of directing it. After they decided to direct Solo: A Star Wars Story (2018) instead, Seth Grahame-Smith entered negotiations to write and direct the film based on Lord and Miller's treatment in October 2015. Grahame-Smith was set to make his directorial debut with the film, with Roven producing, and Deborah and Zack Snyder executive producing. In February 2016, the film's release date was moved forward to March 16, 2018. Grahame-Smith left the project that April, citing creative differences. Warner Bros. chose to retain his script, and he was still expected to be involved in the project moving forward, while Lord and Miller were also still involved as producers. A search for a replacement director began immediately.

Rick Famuyiwa was hired to take over as director in June 2016, with Warner Bros. feeling that Famuyiwa's vision for the film would both resonate with younger audiences and also be compatible with Grahame-Smith's existing script. Filming was expected to begin later in 2016 and was not believed to be delayed by the director change. Famuyiwa's top choice to portray the film's female lead, Iris West, was Kiersey Clemons who he had worked with on Dope (2015). Rita Ora and Lucy Boynton were also in the running for the role, but Clemons was cast as the character at the end of July. At that time, Warner Bros. gave the film's release date to Tomb Raider (2018), leaving The Flash without a release date. In August, Ray Fisher was set to appear in the film, reprising his role as Victor Stone / Cyborg from Batman v Superman and Justice League. Famuyiwa completed a revision of the script a month later, when Gal Gadot was set to reprise her role as Diana Prince / Wonder Woman from Batman v Superman, Wonder Woman (2017), and Justice League, and Billy Crudup was in negotiations to portray Barry's father Henry Allen. Clemons and Crudup both filmed cameo appearances for Justice League after being cast in The Flash. Pre-production began by October ahead of a filming start in March 2017, scheduled before another commitment that Miller had in July. At the end of October, Famuyiwa left the project after not being able to "come together creatively" with the studio, who disagreed with the more mature direction that Famuyiwa wanted to take the film.

The film was put on hold while the studio searched for a new director and Miller prepared to film Fantastic Beasts: The Crimes of Grindelwald (2018). During that time, Warner Bros. decided to take the film in a new direction and in January 2017, Joby Harold was hired to do a page-one rewrite of the script. He handed in a draft by May, when the studio's top choices to direct were Robert Zemeckis and Matthew Vaughn. Both had expressed interest in the project, but had potential scheduling issues that could prevent them from taking it on. Raimi, Marc Webb, and Jordan Peele had already turned down offers to direct the film, as did Ben Affleck who portrayed Bruce Wayne / Batman in previous DCEU films. At the July 2017 San Diego Comic-Con, the film was announced with the new title Flashpoint, based on the comic book of the same title in which Allen travels back in time to save his mother's life and accidentally creates an alternate timeline. Dan Mazeau contributed to the script during this time. Johns confirmed in November that the Flashpoint concept would allow the film to tell a unique story about Batman, with the comic book storyline exploring a timeline where Thomas Wayne is Batman; Jeffrey Dean Morgan expressed interest in reprising his role as Thomas Wayne from Batman v Superman.

In January 2018, the filmmaking duo John Francis Daley and Jonathan Goldstein entered negotiations to write and direct the film after the studio chose not to wait for Zemeckis's schedule to be free. Daley and Goldstein were confirmed as directors in March, and the film's title reverted to The Flash the next month. Filming was expected to begin in Atlanta in February 2019, but Miller's commitments to Fantastic Beasts: The Secrets of Dumbledore (2022) delayed filming again. The Flash was aiming for a 2021 release at that point. In mid-March 2019, Miller was revealed to be writing a new version of the film's script with comic book writer Grant Morrison. Miller disagreed with the light-hearted approach to the film that Daley and Goldstein were taking, though that was Warner Bros.' preferred direction for it. The new script could be submitted to the studio by the end of the month, and if the studio did not like Miller and Morrison's take there was potential for the actor to leave the film; Miller's holding deal to star in the film was expected to end in May. Morrison later said that Miller had not been happy with the prior scripts and approached Morrison with their ideas, and the pair were given two weeks by Warner Bros. to write the script in Scotland. Morrison described their script as "a Flash story", which he felt was a more science fiction story similar to Back to the Future (1985), but said that the studio wanted to explore the multiverse and other DC characters with the film instead. Morrison also denied reports that Miller wanted the film to have a dark tone, and said their script had dark aspects related to the Flashpoint story. The studio rejected Miller and Morrison's script in May, but asked Miller to remain as star of the film. Daley and Goldstein left the project in July, and Warner Bros. chose Christina Hodson to write a new screenplay for the film after writing their DC film Birds of Prey (2020). Andy Muschietti entered negotiations to direct the film, with his sister Barbara set to produce alongside Michael Disco. A January 2020 pre-production start was expected. The involvement of Andy Muschietti and Hodson was confirmed in November 2019, when filming was expected to begin in 2021 after Miller finished filming The Secrets of Dumbledore. A month later, Warner Bros. scheduled The Flash for release on July 1, 2022.

Pre-production 

Andy Muschietti said in January 2020 that the film would still adapt elements of the Flashpoint comic book storyline, but the film would be telling a different version of that story. In April, the film's release was moved forward to June 3, 2022, when Warner Bros. shifted their schedule due to the COVID-19 pandemic. That June, Michael Keaton entered early negotiations to reprise his role as Bruce Wayne / Batman from Tim Burton's Batman (1989) and Batman Returns (1992). Fisher discussed his role as Cyborg in the film with Muschietti that month, before Warner Bros. set a two-week shoot for Fisher to film what was referred to as a cameo appearance alongside other Justice League actors. Fisher said the studio only offered to pay him a fraction of his traditional salary for reprising the role. In August, Keaton was confirmed to be appearing in the film, and Affleck agreed to reprise his version of Batman. Muschietti explained that the film would be introducing the idea of the multiverse to general audiences by including multiple versions of characters and acknowledging past film franchises based on DC Comics as alternate universes. It was important for Muschietti to include Affleck in the film since his version of Batman is the "baseline" for the DCEU, and he felt the introduction of Keaton's Batman would not work as well without first seeing the Flash's relationship with Affleck's Batman. Affleck chose to return, after saying he had retired from the character, because he would have a smaller role in the film.

During the virtual DC FanDome event "Explore the Multiverse" in September 2020, Barbara Muschietti said the film would feature many characters from the DC Universe and the Flash would serve as the bridge between them and their different timelines. She added that the film would be used to restart the continuity of the DCEU without disregarding the events of the prior films. Crudup, who left the film during the changes in directors, entered negotiations to rejoin the project a month later. Clemons' involvement was uncertain at that point. The film's release was pushed back to November 4, 2022, due to further pandemic-related delays, and filming was set to begin in March 2021 in London. Warner Bros. had written Cyborg out of the film by January 2021 after Fisher refused to work on any project that DC Films president Walter Hamada was involved in. Fisher said this was due to Hamada's handling of an investigation into the on-set behavior of Justice League replacement director Joss Whedon. The role of Cyborg was not expected to be recast. Andy and Barbara Muschietti arrived in the United Kingdom to prepare for production, with filming set to begin in April at Warner Bros. Studios, Leavesden, after Miller finished on The Secrets of Dumbledore. In February, construction for sets at Leavesden Studios had begun, Crudup was confirmed to be returning, and Sasha Calle was cast as Supergirl. Calle was chosen from a group of more than 425 actresses that also included Bruna Marquezine. All auditions for the role, as well as chemistry tests with Miller, took place over Zoom.

In March 2021, Clemons signed a new deal to star as Iris West in the film after her role in Justice League was cut (though the cameo was restored in the 2021 director's cut Zack Snyder's Justice League). Maribel Verdú was cast to portray Barry Allen's mother Nora Allen, but Crudup was forced to drop out of the film due to scheduling conflicts with his series The Morning Show. The role of Henry Allen was expected to be recast. At the end of March, Keaton said he had received an older version of the script but had not yet read it, and would have to read the latest draft before deciding if he could commit to the film. He also cited the COVID-19 pandemic in the United Kingdom as a concern for his involvement, as well as balancing his other commitments. Shortly after, Ron Livingston was cast to replace Crudup as Henry Allen, with Ian Loh cast as a young Barry Allen, and Saoirse-Monica Jackson and Rudy Mancuso joining in undisclosed roles. Before filming began, Keaton was confirmed to be starring in the film, with Andy Muschietti believing Keaton's decision to join The Flash was due to the script that he had been sent. Muschietti said Keaton felt honored to play Batman again. The Muschiettis formed a production company, Double Dream, to co-produce the film, and Marianne Jenkins was revealed as an executive producer. Fisher said it would be a "bummer" if the situation surrounding his involvement in the film was not resolved, and said he would return to the role of Cyborg for the film if Warner Bros. were to make amends with him.

Filming 
Principal photography began on April 19, 2021, at Warner Bros. Studios, Leavesden, in England, under the working title Baby Shower. Henry Braham served as cinematographer after previously working on DC's The Suicide Squad (2021). In early May, filming took place at Burghley House in Stamford, Lincolnshire, which doubled for Wayne Manor. In mid-June, Miller, Clemons, Keaton, and Calle filmed scenes at St Paul's Cathedral in London, with the surrounding locations designed to portray Central City. Filming was also set to occur later that month in Edinburgh and Glasgow—doubling for Gotham City—for scenes with Affleck and Keaton. In late July, filming continued in Glasgow at Ingram Street, George Square, John Street, and Cochrane Street, and involved several vehicles, while filming with the Batmobile occurred in George Square. On July 29, filming was halted after a camera operator on a motorcycle shooting behind the Batcycle on Renfield Street collided with it near West George Street. The operator was injured, but not "seriously hurt". In August, Braham said the film was "technically complex" despite not being based in reality, and called the concept of featuring the different generations of comic books in it fantastic. In early September, Luke Brandon Field said he had joined the cast. Filming wrapped on October 18, 2021.

Post-production 
Paul Machliss and Jason Ballantine serve as the film's editors, with Ballantine having previously worked on Andy Muschietti's films It (2017) and It Chapter Two (2019). John "DJ" Desjardin serves as the visual effects supervisor after previously doing so for several DCEU films. In December 2021, Michael Shannon and Antje Traue were revealed to be reprising their roles from Man of Steel (2013) as General Zod and Faora-Ul, respectively. Former co-directors of the film Francis Daley and Goldstein were also confirmed to be receiving story credit for the film alongside Hodson. Temuera Morrison, who portrays Aquaman's father Thomas Curry in Aquaman and Aquaman and the Lost Kingdom (2023), was reported to be in the film in February 2022.

In March 2022, Warner Bros. adjusted its release schedule due to the impacts of the COVID-19 pandemic on the workload of visual effects vendors. The Flash was moved to June 23, 2023, and Aquaman and the Lost Kingdom was also moved from 2022 to 2023, to allow time for their visual effects work to be completed; The Flash had around 2,500 visual effects shots that needed to be completed. The following month, the final writing credits were revealed: Hodson received screenplay credit; Daley, Goldstein, and Harold received screen story credit; and off-screen credit for additional writing material went to Rebecca Drysdale, Famiyuwa, Grahame-Smith, Johns, Lord, Chris Miller, Ezra Miller, Morrison, and DC's Black Adam (2022) co-writer Adam Sztykiel. In May, Deadline Hollywood reported that an unspecified "high-profile" comic book film releasing in 2023, which had its script recently submitted to the Writers Guild of America (WGA), had a total of 45 writers who were involved in the script at various stages of its development, with some commentators believing this film was The Flash, due to the number of publicly known writers who previously were attached. Miller participated in "regularly scheduled additional photography" in mid-2022.

Following several controversial incidents and arrests involving Ezra Miller throughout 2022, Warner Bros. Discovery (the then-newly formed parent company of Warner Bros. Pictures) began feeling mounting pressure to consider different options for the film after previously hoping that its delayed release would help avoid the controversy. In August, the studio was considering the following options: if Miller received professional help they could give an interview explaining their behavior and then do limited press for the film, which would be released as planned; if Miller did not receive help then they could be excluded from all press for the film and the role would potentially be recast for future projects; or if the situation with Miller deteriorated further, the film could be canceled as a "last resort". The latter would be an "unprecedented move" due to its large $200 million budget, though it would come after Warner Bros. Discovery had already canceled the nearly-complete 90-million-dollar film Batgirl that was being produced for the streaming service HBO Max. The studio was not considering replacing Miller with another actor in this film due to them portraying multiple characters and appearing in nearly every scene. The film was considered to be "key" for the studio's future DCEU plans, and had been received well during test screenings despite Miller's legal troubles. Warner Bros. Discovery CEO David Zaslav said at the time that he had seen The Flash, it had received positive responses from the studio, and they were committed to releasing it in theaters. Miller released a public apology through their representative soon afterward and announced that they were seeking professional treatment for "complex mental health issues". Soon after, Miller and their agent met with Michael De Luca and Pamela Abdy, the co-chairpersons and co-CEOs of Warner Bros. Pictures Group, to apologize for their behavior and the negative headlines the film received as a result. This came after Miller was "spooked" by the prospect of the film being canceled. Visual effects work was expected to potentially be completed by the end of the year. Machliss later stated that the film was the first to use new technology to feature different versions of an actor on screen.

In December 2022, the film's release date was moved forward to June 16, 2023, following positive test screenings, while The Hollywood Reporter reported that Henry Cavill and Jason Mamoa were set to make cameo appearances as Superman and Aquaman, respectively, and that Cavill had filmed his role in September. The studio was reportedly debating on retaining the cameos depending on their future plans for the characters, with plans for the film not yet finalized as it had yet to enter picture lock. Cavill's cameo, along with one Gal Gadot had filmed as Wonder Woman, were soon reported to have been cut, after DC Studios chose not to move forward with sequels to Man of Steel and Wonder Woman 1984 (2020). Cavill was paid $250,000 for his cameo in The Flash.

Music 
Benjamin Wallfisch was set to compose the film's score by April 2021 after previously working with Muschietti on It and It Chapter Two. Wallfisch also previously wrote the score for DC's Shazam! (2019). By late August 2022, Wallfish was set to begin a scoring session at Abbey Road Studios in London.

Marketing 
Miller debuted the first footage from the film at the virtual DC FanDome event in October 2021. They said there was not enough footage available to make a full trailer or teaser, but William Hughes at The A.V. Club felt the footage could comfortably be categorized as a teaser. He said being able to see it was proof of the film actually being made after its long and troubled production history. Polygon Matt Patches and io9 James Whitbrook both highlighted the footage as the beginning of the DC multiverse on film, with its hints at Keaton's version of Batman and the reveal that Miller would portray multiple versions of Barry Allen. In February 2022, more footage was released as part of a teaser for Warner Bros.' 2022 slate of DC films, which also included The Batman, Black Adam, and Aquaman and the Lost Kingdom (before The Flash and Aquaman and the Lost Kingdom were delayed to 2023). A new trailer was shown at Warner Bros.' CinemaCon panel in April 2022, and was noted by attendees for Keaton's Batman reusing the line "You wanna get nuts? Let's get nuts" from Batman.

DC Comics published a three-issue prequel comic book limited series titled The Flash: The Fastest Man Alive, written by Kenny Porter with art by Ricardo López Ortiz, Juan Ferreyra, and Jason Howard. The first issue was released on September 13, 2022, and features a variant cover by Andy Muschietti, which was followed by the second issue on October 11, and the third issue on November 8. The comic series is set after the events of Justice League and depicts Batman training the Flash and the Flash's early days as he attempts to defeat the supervillains Girder, Tar Pit, and the Top. A trade paperback collection of the limited series will also be released. The first trailer for The Flash was shown during Super Bowl LVII on February 12, 2023, before playing in theaters ahead of Ant-Man and the Wasp: Quantumania. The trailer had the most engagement on social media, outpacing other trailers that were shown in the likes of Guardians of the Galaxy Vol. 3 and Transformers: Rise of the Beasts, with RelishMix reporting the trailer gained 97.4M views within a 24-hour period. Many commentators highlighted Keaton's reprisal as Batman and Calle's role as Supergirl, and also noted the de-emphasized focus on Miller's Flash following their controversies. Charles Pulliam-Moore of The Verge particularly felt that "it’s the other heroes they’re [the Flash] going to be allying with who are likely to steal the show", and felt that Supergirl and Keaton's Batman was being posited as the film’s "World's Finest", and expressed enthusiasm for Supergirl's role in the story. Alli Rosenbloom from CNN also praised Keaton's appearance, praising the usage of Danny Elfman's score from Batman (1989), while Collier Jennings from Collider felt that trailer "certainly is working to sell the image that the wait was worth it".

Release 
The Flash is scheduled to have its world premiere at CinemaCon on April 25, 2023, before its release by Warner Bros. Pictures in the United States on June 16, 2023. The film was initially scheduled for release on March 23, 2018, when Warner Bros. first announced their slate of DCEU films, before it was moved to March 16. In July 2016, this release date was given to Tomb Raider, and The Flash was not given another release date until the hiring of Andy Muschietti in July 2019, after which the film was slated for release on July 1, 2022. It was then moved up to June 3, 2022, before being delayed to November 4, 2022, after Warner Bros. shifted its release schedule due to the COVID-19 pandemic. It moved to June 23, 2023, when Warner Bros. again adjusted its release schedule, this time due to the impact of the pandemic on the workload of visual effects vendors, before moving forward a week to June 16, 2023, after positive test screenings.

Future 
By October 2022, a script for a sequel had been written by David Leslie Johnson-McGoldrick, who wrote the Aquaman films, in the event The Flash performed well. Warner Bros. was not expected to retain Miller for future films due to the actor's controversies and legal issues, although some Warner Bros. executives were open to continuing with Miller by January 2023 since they began treatment. That same month, DC Studios CEO James Gunn confirmed that the film will reset the entire universe and, alongside Aquaman and the Lost Kingdom, would lead into the upcoming Superman: Legacy (2025), segueing into the new DC Universe.

References

External links 
 
 

2020s American films
2020s English-language films
2020s superhero films
2023 science fiction action films
American fantasy films
American science fiction action films
American superhero films
DC Extended Universe films
Films about murder
Films about parallel universes
Films about time travel
Films directed by Andy Muschietti
Films postponed due to the COVID-19 pandemic
Films scored by Benjamin Wallfisch
Films shot at Warner Bros. Studios, Leavesden
Films shot in Cambridgeshire
Films shot in Edinburgh
Films shot in Glasgow
Films shot in Hertfordshire
Films shot in London
Films with screenplays by Christina Hodson
Flash (comics) in other media
Science fiction crossover films
Superhero crossover films
Upcoming English-language films
Warner Bros. films